Der kleine Häwelmann (Little Havelman) is an East German short film based on the fairy tale of the same name. It was released in 1956.

Synopsis
A mother tells her child called Little Havelman a story to make him fall asleep. He is bored which is why he rides through the city with his bed. Everyone else is sleeping. He keeps riding into the sky and knocks the stars and moon out of their place, and the moon doesn't want to shine for him anymore. Finally, Little Havelman falls asleep too.

References

External links
 

1956 films
1956 animated films
German animated short films
East German films
1950s German-language films
Animated films based on children's books
Films based on works by Theodor Storm
1950s stop-motion animated films
German children's films
1950s German films